I-Logix was a leading provider of Collaborative Model driven development (MDD) solutions for systems design through software development focused on real-time embedded applications. Founded in 1987, the Andover, Massachusetts-based company product line enhanced collaboration among engineers, graphically modeling the requirements, behavior, and functionality of embedded systems. In addition, I-Logix was a member of the UML Partners, a group devoted to the development of the Unified Modeling Language (UML).

History
I-Logix was founded in Israel as AdCad Ltd. in April 1984 by David Harel, Amir Pnueli and brothers Ido and Hagi Lachover to develop and commercialize a tool to support statecharts and their execution. This was based on work done by David Harel at the Weizmann Institute of Science, working as a consultant for the Lavi Aircraft project, which was being developed at the time by Israel Aerospace Industries. Specifically, Harel was hired to help develop a solution for clearly designing and defining the aircraft's avionics systems and came up with the concept of statecharts and a tool to support their development.

In 1986, the company completed the development of a software tool for statecharts called Statemate. At the heart of a Statemate model was a functional decomposition controlled by statecharts. The user could draw the statecharts and the model's other artifacts, could check and analyze them, could produce documents from them, and could manage their configurations and versions. Additionally, Statemate could fully execute statecharts. The tool could also generate from them, automatically, executable code; first in the Ada programming language and later also in the C programming language.

In 1987, the company was re-formed as a US entity, called I-Logix Inc., and AdCad Ltd. became its R&D branch, renamed as I-Logix Israel, Ltd.

In 1996, I-Logix released Rhapsody, a tool that, unlike Statemate (which is not object-oriented and is intended more for systems people and for mixed hardware/software systems), is object-oriented and is intended more for software systems.

In December 1999, I-Logix raised $10 million in funding from North Bridge Venture Partners and Deutsche Telekom to develop new worldwide sales channels.

In 2001, I-Logix acquired the iNOTION product life-cycle management (PLM) technology from KLA-Tencor.

During the 2000s, the company's sales grew quickly and it became a leader in the Embedded Systems and Software Development tools market; winning customers such as General Motors, Lockheed Martin (who uses the I-Logix tools in the Joint Strike Fighter F-35 program) and BAE Systems  (who uses the I-Logix tools in the Eurofighter Typhoon program).

In March 2006, the company was acquired by Telelogic AB for $80 million and integrated as a business unit for embedded modeling, the I-Logix name ceasing to exist. In turn, Telelogic AB accepted IBM's offer on April 3, 2008, its products becoming part of IBM's Rational Software unit.

In 2007 the team that developed Statemate won the ACM Software System Award as:

Products
Major examples of the tools I-Logix created before it was acquired are Statemate and Rhapsody (now IBM Rational Rhapsody), which both was and still used by all major automotive and aerospace/defence manufacturers and suppliers. Currently under IBM management Statemate is not gaining new market, while Rhapsody tends to gain its position as a replacement.

See also
Model driven development
IBM Rational Rhapsody

References 

Software companies based in Massachusetts
Software companies of Israel
Defunct software companies of the United States